Battle Autumn '22 was a professional wrestling event produced by New Japan Pro-Wrestling (NJPW). It took place on November 5, 2022 in Osaka, Japan at Osaka Prefectural Gymnasium.

Battle Autumn featured the return of Shota Umino, who returned after Will Ospreay called out any NJPW wrestler, after the successful defense of his IWGP United States Championship against Tetsuya Naito.

Storylines
Battle Autumn featured nine professional wrestling matches that involved different wrestlers from pre-existing scripted feuds and storylines. Wrestlers portrayed villains, heroes, or less distinguishable characters in the scripted events that built tension and culminated in a wrestling match or series of matches.

Results

References

2022 in professional wrestling
Events in Osaka
New Japan Pro-Wrestling shows
Professional wrestling in Osaka